The Plaza de Armas De San Fernando is the main square of Santiago, the capital of Chile. Plaza de Armas metro station is located under the square. Surrounding the square are some historic buildings, including the Metropolitan Cathedral of Santiago, Central Post Office Building, Palacio de la Real Audiencia de Santiago, and the building that serves as the seat of local government for Santiago, which was formerly occupied by the Cabildo of the city before being remodeled. There are also other architecturally significant buildings that face the square, including the Capilla del Sagrario, the Palacio arzobispal, the Edificio Comercial Edwards, and the Portal Fernández Concha. The Casa Colorada, the Cuartel General del Cuerpo de Bomberos de Santiago and the Museo Chileno de Arte Precolombino are located a short walk from the square.

History 
The church is the centerpiece of the initial layout of Santiago, which has a square grid pattern. This urban design was accomplished by Pedro de Gamboa, who was appointed by Pedro de Valdivia in 1541.

Freedom of Latin America monument 
The monument is located at the center of the square and depicts an allegory of Freedom, with a woman breaking the chains of a native woman. It is made of Carrara marble and sculpted by Francesco Orselino. The monument replaced a bronze fountain made in 1671, which is presently located in La Moneda Palace.

Other commemorative structures include an equestrian statue of Pedro de Valdivia, a statue of James the Great, the indigenous peoples monument, a time capsule, and ground plaques, including that marking the kilometre zero of Santiago.

See also 
Plaza de Armas
La Parva

References 

Buildings and structures in Santiago
Squares in Chile
Tourist attractions in Santiago, Chile